The Bottomless Bag is a 2017 Russian historical drama film directed by Rustam Khamdamov. The film is based on Ryunosuke Akutagawa's 1922 story In a Grove which takes place during the times of Tsar Alexander II.

Plot
The story takes place during the reign of Russian Emperor Alexander II. The maid of honor of  princely palace tells  prince a fairy tale that occurs in the XIII century and tells about the mystical murder of  prince in the forest. The participants in the story, witnesses of this crime, tell different versions of the incident, which are different from what actually happened.

Cast
 Svetlana Nemolyaeva as Lady-in-waiting 
 Sergey Koltakov as  Grand Prince
 Anna Mikhalkova as Empress
 Andrey Kuzichev as  Prince	
 Kirill Pletnyov as  robber
 Alla Demidova as 	Baba Yaga
 Yevgeny Tkachuk as	guard

Awards and nominations

References

External links
 
 The Bottomless Bag on International Film Festival Rotterdam

Russian black-and-white films
Russian historical drama films
Russian mystery films
2010s historical drama films
Films based on short fiction